The Late Show is a radio documentary program that first aired on CBC Radio One in the summer of 2008 with a second season in the Summer of 2010 and a third in 2011. Hosted by Gordon Pinsent, The Late Show presents documentaries which are essentially extended obituaries of ordinary, but interesting, Canadians who have recently died.

External links
Official website

CBC Radio One programs
Canadian documentary radio programs